Smilen Zlatanov (born 1 February 1992) is a Bulgarian footballer who currently plays as a midfielder for Septemvri Simitli.

References

External links
 

1993 births
Living people
Bulgarian footballers
PFC Pirin Blagoevgrad players
Association football midfielders
First Professional Football League (Bulgaria) players
Association football defenders